Max and His Mother-in-Law (French: Max et sa belle-mère) is the title of both a 1911 and 1914 French film directed by Max Linder, Lucien Nonguet.
The 1914 film is not a remake.
The film is also known as Max and His Ma-in-Law (in the United Kingdom).

Plot 
Max and his young bride attempt to enjoy an Alpine honeymoon, despite the presence of her mother.

Cast 
Max Linder as Max

Léon Belières, Charles de Rochefort, Gabrielle Lange, Paulette Lorsy, Pâquerette and Jacques Vandenne also appear.

Soundtrack

References

External links 

Cinema of France

1914 films
French silent short films
1910s French-language films
French black-and-white films
Films directed by Max Linder
1914 comedy films
1914 short films
French comedy short films
Silent comedy films
1910s French films